Domingão com Huck (lit. Big Sunday with Huck) is a Brazilian variety show hosted by Luciano Huck. Premiering September 5, 2021 on TV Globo, it is the successor to both Domingão do Faustão, and Huck's previous show Caldeirão do Huck.

History 
In June 2021, after Fausto Silva left the network and signed with Rede Bandeirantes (where he would host the new show Faustão na Band in 2022), Globo announced that Luciano Huck—who had hosted the variety show Caldeirão do Huck for the network since 2000—would host a new Sunday-afternoon variety show in September 2021 to replace the long-running Domingão do Faustão. Domingão com Huck premiered on September 5, 2021. Meanwhile, Marcos Mion would succeed Huck on Caldeirão, which premiered the day prior.

The November 7, 2021 episode featured a tribute to sertanejo singer Marília Mendonça, who had died in a plane crash earlier that week. Huck faced criticism for some of the remarks he made during the episode, including saying that he saw "half" of Marília, Maiara, and Maraísa in concert because they were skinny. He also discussed his survival of a plane crash with his family in 2015, which some viewers criticized as egocentric. Huck apologized the following week, saying that he immediately regretted the joke and believed that people should not be judged on their appearance.

Segments 
Some of the major game show and reality competition segments seen on Domingão com Huck have been carried over from Faustão and Caldeirão, including Dança dos Famosos, Show dos Famosos, Soletrando, Quem quer ser um milionário?, and The Wall. Globo's annual Melhores do Ano presentation also moved to the program from Faustão.

New segments have also been produced for the series, including Acredite Em Quem Quiser and Lip Sync Battle.

Reception

Viewership 
In the IBOPE ratings, the series premiere of Domingão com Huck received 18.5 rating points (approximately 1.4 million viewers) in Greater São Paulo, down from the numbers that Faustão had received. It was originally intended to air following Brazil's match against Argentina in the 2022 FIFA World Cup qualifiers, but the match was curtailed in the fifth minute due to COVID-19 issues; Globo aired the film Pacific Rim in place of the cancelled match, causing Domingão com Huck to be pre-empted by 35 minutes.

The November 7, 2021 episode with tributes to Marília Mendonça received 19.1 ratings points, its largest audience at the time. The June 5, 2022 episode—which featured interviews with the cast of Globo's telenovela Pantanal from its namesake—brought Domingão com Huck its largest audience to-date, with a 19.7 rating.

References 

Rede Globo original programming
2021 Brazilian television series debuts
2020s Brazilian television series
Portuguese-language television shows